The seventh wave of Walt Disney Treasures was released on December 11, 2007.

The Chronological Donald , Volume Three

50,000 sets produced.

Disc one
1947
 Straight Shooters, April 18, 1947
 Sleepy Time Donald, May 9, 1947
 Donald's Dilemma, July 11, 1947
 Crazy with the Heat, August 1, 1947 (in a Donald & Goofy cartoon)
 Bootle Beetle, August 22, 1947
 Wide Open Spaces, September 12, 1947
 Chip an' Dale, November 28, 1947

1948
 Drip Dippy Donald, March 5, 1948
 Daddy Duck, April 6, 1948
 Donald's Dream Voice, May 21, 1948
 The Trial of Donald Duck, July 30, 1948
 Inferior Decorator, August 27, 1948
 Soup's On, October 15, 1948

From the Vault
 Clown of the Jungle, June 20, 1947
 Three for Breakfast, November 5, 1948
 Tea for Two Hundred, December 24, 1948

Bonus Features
 The Many Faces of Donald Duck: Leonard Maltin interviews film historians and Disney crew members of Donald's importance to Disney. Much is said of his extensive film career, such as his appearances in films like The Three Caballeros, Who Framed Roger Rabbit and Fantasia 2000, as well as appearances on the Walt Disney anthology series on television.
 Donald on the Mickey Mouse Club: Maltin explains how each week on The Mickey Mouse Club, the classic opening theme sequence would end with a gag involving Donald and the gong he is supposed to strike. Ten of those Fourteen gags (complete with the opening) are scattered about this set as Easter eggs with five eggs on each disc.
 Galleries: On both discs are a set of galleries containing each of the respective discs' cartoons' storyboards and background paintings.

Disc two
1949
 Sea Salts, April 8, 1949
 Winter Storage, June 3, 1949
 Honey Harvester, August 5, 1949
 All in a Nutshell, September 2, 1949
 The Greener Yard, October 14, 1949
 Slide, Donald, Slide, November 25, 1949
 Toy Tinkers, December 16, 1949

1950
 Lion Around, January 20, 1950
 Crazy Over Daisy, March 24, 1950
 Trailer Horn, April 28, 1950
 Hook, Lion & Sinker, September 1, 1950
 Out On A Limb, December 15, 1950

From the Vault
 Donald's Happy Birthday, February 13, 1949
 Bee At The Beach, October 13, 1950

Bonus Features
 Sculpting Donald Leonard Maltin meets with acclaimed Disney sculptor Ruben Procopio, who demonstrates how to transfer a flat 2D character like Donald into 3D. He also discusses his background and how his father influenced his work.
 Donald on the Mickey Mouse Club: Same as Disc One.
 Galleries: On both discs are a set of galleries containing each of the respective discs' cartoons' storyboards and background paintings.

The Adventures of Oswald the Lucky Rabbit

Note: Of the twenty-seven Disney produced Oswald the Lucky Rabbit cartoons, only thirteen were accessible for release as part of the WDT line at the time. However, after this set came out, a further seven Oswald cartoons were recovered by the studio in efforts overseen by the Disney historian Dave Bossert.

120,000 sets produced.

Disc one
1927
Introduction by film author and historian Leonard Maltin
Trolley Troubles
Oh Teacher (Available with commentary by Mark Kausler in "Bonus Material")
The Mechanical Cow
Great Guns!
 All Wet
The Ocean Hop (Available with commentary by Mark Kausler in "Bonus Material")
1928
Rival Romeos
Bright Lights (Available with commentary by Leonard Maltin and Jerry Beck in "Bonus Material")
Ozzie of the Mounted (Available with commentary by Jerry Beck in "Bonus Material")
Oh What A Knight (Available with commentary by Leonard Maltin and Mark Kausler in "Bonus Material")
Sky Scrappers
The Fox Chase (Available with commentary by Jerry Beck in "Bonus Material")
Tall Timber

Bonus Material
Oswald Comes Home Documentary on how Oswald, the Lucky Rabbit returned to the Walt Disney Company's ownership, hosted by Leonard Maltin. 
Audio Commentaries
Sagebrush Sadie (Fragment)
Still Frame Galleries

Disc two
The Hand Behind The Mouse: The Ub Iwerks Story, a 1999 documentary that was Written, Produced and Directed by Ub Iwerks granddaughter Leslie Iwerks.

"The Work of Ub Iwerks"
Before Oswald
Alice Gets Stung
Alice in the Wooly West
Alice's Balloon Race
After Oswald
Plane Crazy
Steamboat Willie
Skeleton Dance

Disneyland: Secrets, Stories and Magic

50,000 sets produced.

Disc one
Disneyland: Secrets, Stories and Magic of the Happiest Place on Earth: An 81 minute documentary of the park, produced in 2005 during the 50th anniversary of Disneyland.
Wonderful World of Disneyland Trivia Game
People and Places: Disneyland U.S.A.: a 42-minute theatrically-released, two-reel 1956 CinemaScope film that showcases the then newly opened Disneyland.

Disc two
Operation Disneyland: A behind the scenes look at the preparations for the live broadcast of the opening of Disneyland, filmed for ABC in July 1955. 
The Golden Horseshoe Revue: An episode of Wonderful World of Color featuring the 10,000 performance of The Golden Horseshoe Revue. Aired on September 23, 1962.
Disneyland Goes to the World's Fair: An episode of Wonderful World of Color featuring Walt Disney's presence at the 1964 New York World's Fair. Aired May 17, 1964.
Disneyland Around the Seasons: An episode of Wonderful World of Color featuring new additions to the park, such as It's a Small World, New Orleans Square and Great Moments with Mr. Lincoln. Aired December 18, 1966 (three days after Walt Disney's death).

References

External links
 
 waltdisneytreasures.com

Bibliography 
 

7